Miriam Ivette Pabón Carrión (born January 3, 1985), also known as Mimi Pabón, is a Puerto Rican model, TV host, entertainment reporter, actress and beauty pageant titleholder.

Early life
Born in New York, she moved with her family back to Puerto Rico at age 9. Since early age she demonstrated a big interest in dance, music, modeling and everything related to the entertainment industry. She received her education in public schools and then went on to study at both the University of Puerto Rico at Humacao and then in the Río Piedras Campus, where she majored a Magna Cum Laude Degree in Theater & Education. She later on did a Post Graduate Degree in Event Production:

Pageantry

Miss Puerto Rico Teen Latina
At age 16 she won the title of Miss Puerto Rico Teen Latina.

Miss International 2008
Miriam represented Puerto Rico at the Miss International 2008 pageant held in Japan and Macau on November 8, 2008, where she placed in the Top 12.

Miss World Puerto Rico 2008
In 2008, Pabon represented Juncos municipality at Miss World Puerto Rico 2008 where she finished as 3rd Runner-Up.

Miss America 2010
On July 31, 2009, Pabón was crowned Miss Puerto Rico 2009 and also won the Community Service Award. She went on to represent Puerto Rico at the Miss America 2010 pageant where she won the Swimsuit Preliminary Competition, becoming the first representative of Puerto Rico and a territory to do so. She was the first woman to represent Puerto Rico at Miss America pageant after 50 years of absence.

Miss Universe Puerto Rico 2011
In 2010 she represented San Juan municipality in the Miss Universe Puerto Rico 2011 pageant where she placed in the Top 10 and won the Miss L'Bel Face Award.

Career
Mimi started to model at the early age of 3 and went professional at age 14. As a model she has featured in covers and editorials of magazines like Ocean Drive, Imagén, Caras, Buena Vida, Esposa Moderna, Agenda para la Novia, Maxim, and more. She has landed campaigns for brands like Walmart, Avon, L’bel, Beyond Salon, Esika, Kinder Bueno, Chevrolet, and more.

Around age 16 she started a career as an actress for commercials and films. Some of the national gigs she landed were Burger King, Jeep, Pepsi, Heineken, Brugal, Armor All, and IBC Root Beer as well as other brands.

She has appeared in music videos for Latin artists like Don Omar, Ricky Martin, N'Klabe, Víctor Manuelle, and Elvis Crespo. She co-starred in the short films Heaven & Hell and Panas Arrested and had a minor role in the TV series Decisiones Puerto Rico. She was also one of Zoe Saldana's stand-ins for The Losers. In 2018 En Alta Mar was released her first film.

Miriam divides her time as an actress, model and mainly as a TV presenter and entertainment reporter working for channels like WAPA and WAPA America and Mega TV.In 2009, she started working as a host for the Lottery Games of Puerto Rico. In 2012, she hosted the backstage coverage for Idol Puerto Rico's 2nd and 3rd season. As an entertainment reporter she has a long list of many major Latin artists she has interviewed including various Grammy winners like Ednita Nazario, Tommy Torres, Prince Royce, Noel Schajris, Gilberto Santa Rosa, Carlos Vives, Luis Enrique, Pablo Alborán, Jerry Rivera, Víctor Manuelle, Tito El Bambino, Wisin & Yandel, Elvis Crespo, Arcángel, Kany Garcia, Sie7e, Jesse & Joy, Antonio Orozco, Pedro Capó, and many more.

In April 2014 Miriam started hosting and producing Wapa & Wapa America's new TV project "Fashion House", a fashion, style & celebrity oriented show. She became a big social media influencer after leaving Wapa and eventually started as the TV Host of Mega TV's Paparazzi TV show.

Personal life
In 2012 Pabón married barber Ángel Reyes. However, in 2013, after less than one year of marriage they got divorced in 2014.

In 2012 she gave birth to her son with Reyes, Ricardo Reyes Pabon.

In summer 2018 she moved back to New York to continue her acting career.

References

External links
 

1985 births
Living people
Miss America 2010 delegates
People from Las Piedras, Puerto Rico
Puerto Rican female models
Puerto Rican beauty pageant winners
Miss America Preliminary Swimsuit winners
Miss International 2008 delegates
Models from New York City
American people of Puerto Rican descent
Social media influencers
University of Puerto Rico alumni